Damascius (458 – after 538), known as "the last of the Athenian Neoplatonists," was the last scholarch of the neoplatonic Athenian school. He was one of the neoplatonic philosophers who left Athens after laws confirmed by emperor Justinian I forced the closure of the Athenian school in c. 529 AD. After he left Athens, he may have sought refuge in the court of the Persian King Chrosroes, before being allowed back into the Byzantine Empire. His surviving works consist of three commentaries on the works of Plato, and a metaphysical text entitled Difficulties and Solutions of First Principles.

Life
Much of what is known about Damascius' life comes from his semi-autobiographical work called The Philosophical History, or Life of Isidore, and from a work called Vita Severi written by the 6th-century bishop and historian Zacharias Scholasticus. Damascius, as his name suggests, was born in Damascus in c. 462 AD, and travelled to Alexandria in the 480s AD to study rhetoric at the coeducational school of the late 5th-century Alexandrian professor Horapollo, where students of different religions and philosophies studied together. Zacharias reports that there was a close relationship between the neoplatonic communities of Athens and Alexandria, as Agapius of Athens and Severianus of Damascus, students of Proclus' neoplatonic school in Athens, also studied in neoplatonic schools in Alexandria. Damascius may have travelled to Athens shortly before Proclus died in 485 AD, to teach rhetoric, and travelled back to Alexandria before 488 AD.

Late 5th-century Alexandria was a tumultuous place; there were conflicting factions of pro-Chalcedonian and Monophysite Christians, and a growing hostile sentiment towards neoplatonists and people of other non-Christian religions and philosophies that sometimes led to rioting and arrests of leaders of non-Christian schools, resulting in students having to flee and go into hiding. Damascius' accounts of these times paints a picture of a circle of intellectuals that was under siege, arrested, interrogated and who were sometimes courageous, but at other times capitulated. Horapollo, the head of the school at which Damascius had studied and taught rhetoric for nine years, was arrested in 489 AD, causing Damascius and the neoplatonic philosopher Isidore of Alexandria to flee Alexandria and start on a journey to Athens with the aim of studying in the neoplatonic school in Athens.

That journey took eight months, and during that time Damascius writes that he lost interest in pursuing a profession as a rhetorician. When they finally arrived in Athens, Damascius and Isidore became students of the 5th-century neoplatonist Marinus of Neapolis, Proclus' successor, at the neoplatonic school of Athens. By 515 AD, Damascius had become head of the neoplatonic school in Athens, succeeding Marinus of Neapolis successor Isidore, and continued Isidore's path of steering the school back to the philosophical studies of Aristotle, Plato, Orphic theogony and the Chaldean Oracles, and away from theurgy and rituals, which were previously being favoured, most likely due to the increasing external pressure on the school's philosophical teachings. Damascius was still the head of the school in 529 AD after the Byzantine emperor Justinian I confirmed his Novum Justinianeum Codicem, or Codex Justinianus, on the 7th of April 529 AD; and administrators enforcing the new laws, after they had legal force on the 16th of April 529 AD, closed the last neoplatonic school in Athens.

According to the 6th-century historian Agathias, soon after the school closed in 529 AD, Damascius, Isidore and the 6th-century neoplatonic philosophers Simplicius of Cilicia, Eulamius of Phrygia, Priscianus of Lydia, Hermias and Diogenes of Phoenicia left Athens and travelled to Persia, where they had heard that the intellectual climate might be more suited to them, under the refuge of the Persian King Chrosroes. It is not known if Damascius and his retinue of philosophers arrived in Persia, although late 20th- and early 21st-century scholarship by the French historian and philosopher Pierre Hadot, French scholar Michel Tardieu and German historian and philosopher Ilsetraut Hadot advanced the establishment of a neoplatonic school in Charrae (present-day Harran, Turkey) in the Persian Empire, a view that is disputed by other 21st-century scholarship. The last known trace of Damascius is an epigram carved in stele in Emesa that confirms Damascius returned to Syria in 538 AD, and that is also the year scholars say he died. Damascius composed a number of works, and a significant number of his works in fragments or derived from his writings survived, the more complete works being: the literary work Life of Isidore, or Philosophical History, preserved by Saint Photius the Great; and the philosophical works: Problems and Solutions Concerning First Principles; Commentary on the Parmenides; Commentary on the Phaedo; and Lectures on the Philebus.

Writings
His chief treatise is entitled Difficulties and Solutions of First Principles. It examines the nature and attributes of God and the human soul. This examination is, in two respects, in striking contrast to that of certain other Neoplatonist writers. It is conspicuously free from Oriental mysticism, and it contains no polemic against Christianity, to the doctrines of which, in fact, there is no allusion. Hence the charge of impiety which Photius brings against him. In this treatise Damascius inquires into the first principle of all things, which he finds to be an unfathomable and unspeakable divine depth, being all in one, but undivided. His main result is that God is infinite, and as such, incomprehensible; that his attributes of goodness, knowledge and power are credited to him only by inference from their effects; that this inference is logically valid and sufficient for human thought. He insists throughout on the unity and the indivisibility of God. This work is, moreover, of great importance for the history of philosophy, because of the great number of accounts which it contains concerning former philosophers.

The rest of Damascius's writings are for the most part commentaries on works of Aristotle and Plato. Surviving commentaries include: 
Commentary on Plato's Parmenides.
Commentary on Plato's Phaedo. This work has been erroneously ascribed to Olympiodorus of Alexandria.
Commentary on Plato's Philebus. Also erroneously ascribed to Olympiodorus.

Lost or fragmentary works include:
Commentaries on Plato's Timaeus, First Alcibiades, and other dialogues.
Commentaries on Aristotle's De Caelo, and other works. The writings of Damascius on Time, Space, and Number, cited by Simplicius in his commentary on Aristotle's Physica, are perhaps parts of his commentaries on Aristotle's writings.
Life of Isidore.  Damascius's biography of his teacher Isidore (perhaps a part of the philosophos historia attributed to Damascius by the Suda), of which Photius preserved a considerable fragment.  It is considered the source containing most details about the life of Ammonius Hermiae, and is also a primary source for the life of Hypatia. Incorporating material from both the Suda and Photius, a reconstructed text was translated into English by Polymnia Athanassiadi and published in 1999 as Damascius. The Philosophical History. 
Logoi Paradoxoi, in 4 books, of which Photius gives an account and specifies the respective titles of the books.

Damascius and the Corpus Dionysiacum 
Starting from an article published in 2006, Byzantine philologist Carlo Maria Mazzucchi has argued that Damascius was the author of the Pseudo-Dionysian corpus, the "last counter-offensive of Paganism" (l'ultima controffensiva del paganesimo). Mazzucchi's theory, which faced some criticism, was later improved with more arguments.

See also
Ammonius Saccas
Azone
Decline of Greco-Roman polytheism
Iamblichus
Olympiodorus the Younger
Plotinus
Proclus
Simplicius of Cilicia
Theodora of Emesa

References

Sources
 
Polymnia Athanassiadi, Persecution and Response in late Paganism. The evidence of Damascius. In: Journal of Hellenic Studies 113 (1993), pp. 1–29.
Polymnia Athanassiadi (editor and translator), Damascius. The Philosophical History.  Athens: Apamea Cultural Association, 1999.
Cosmin Andron, Damascius on Knowledge and its Object. In: Rhizai 1 (2004) pp. 107–124
Sebastian R. P. Gertz, Death and Immortality in Late Neoplatonism: Studies on the Ancient Commentaries on Plato's Phaedo, Leiden: Brill, 2011.
 Sebastian R. P. Gertz, "From 'Immortal' to 'Imperishable': Damascius on the Final Argument in Plato's Phaedo". In: Ancient Readings of Plato's Phaedo (Leiden: 2015), 240–55.
 
Raban von Haehling, Damascius und die heidnische Opposition im 5. Jahrhundert nach Christus. In: Jahrbuch für Antike und Christentum 23 (1980), pp. 82–85.
Udo Hartmann, Geist im Exil. Römische Philosophen am Hof der Sasaniden. In: Udo Hartmann/Andreas Luther/Monika Schuol (eds.), Grenzüberschreitungen. Formen des Kontakts zwischen Orient und Okzident im Altertum. Stuttgart 2002, pp. 123–160.
Androniki Kalogiratou, The Portrayal of Socrates by Damascius. In: Phronimon: Journal of the South African Society for Greek Philosophy and the Humanities 7 (1) 2006, pp. 45–54.
Androniki Kalogiratou, Theology in Philosophy: The Case of the Late Antique Neoplatonist Damascius. In Skepsis: A Journal for Philosophy and Interdisciplinary Research XVIII, i-ii, 2007, pp. 58–79. 
Robert Lamberton, "Damascius. The Philosophical History" (book review), Bryn Mawr Classical Review, January 1, 2000.
 
 
 
John R. Martindale, John Morris, The Prosopography of the Later Roman Empire II. Cambridge 1980, pp. 342f.
Carlo Maria Mazzucchi, Damascio, Autore del Corpus Dionysiacum, e il dialogo Περι Πολιτικης Επιστημης. In: Aevum: Rassegna di scienze storiche linguistiche e filologiche 80, Nº 2 (2006), pp. 299–334.
Carlo Maria Mazzucchi, Iterum de Damascio Areopagita. In: Aevum: Rassegna di scienze storiche linguistiche e filologiche 87, Nº 1 (2013), pp. 249–265.
Sara Ahbel-Rappe, Scepticism in the sixth century? Damascius' 'Doubts and Solutions Concerning First Principles,'  Journal of the History of Philosophy 36 (1998), pp. 337–363.
Marilena Vlad, Damascius et l'ineffable. Récit de l'impossible discours  (Paris, Vrin, 2019)
Tiziano F. Ottobrini (a cura di), Damascio Intorno ai principi primi - Aporie e soluzioni, Editrice Morcelliana, (2022), pp. 835

5th-century births
6th-century deaths
5th-century Byzantine people
6th-century Byzantine people
6th-century philosophers
Byzantine philosophers
Commentators on Aristotle
Commentators on Plato
Deist philosophers
Neoplatonists
People from Damascus
People from the Sasanian Empire
Late-Roman-era pagans
Ancient Roman philosophers
Syrian philosophers
Neoplatonists in Athens
6th-century Byzantine writers